A creed, also known as a confession of faith, a symbol, or a statement of faith, is a statement of the shared beliefs of a community (often a religious community) in a form which is structured by subjects which summarize its core tenets.

The earliest known creed in Christianity, "Jesus is Lord", originated in the writings of Paul the Apostle. One of the most widely used Christian creeds is the Nicene Creed, first formulated in AD 325 at the First Council of Nicaea. It was based on Christian understanding of the canonical gospels, the letters of the New Testament and, to a lesser extent, the Old Testament. Affirmation of this creed, which describes the Trinity, is generally taken as a fundamental test of orthodoxy for most Christian denominations, and was historically purposed against Arianism. A shorter version of the creed, called the Apostles' Creed, is nowadays the most used version in Christian services. 

Some Christian denominations do not use any of those creeds.

In Islamic theology, the term most closely corresponding to "creed" is ʿaqīdah.

Terminology

The word creed is particularly used for a concise statement which is recited as part of liturgy. The term is anglicized from Latin credo "I believe", the incipit of the Latin texts of the Apostles' Creed and the Nicene Creed. A creed is sometimes referred to as a symbol in a specialized meaning of that word (which was first introduced to Late Middle English in this sense), after Latin symbolum "creed" (as in Symbolum Apostolorum = the "Apostles' Creed", a shorter version of the traditional Nicene Creed), after Greek symbolon "token, watchword".

Some longer statements of faith in the Protestant tradition are instead called "confessions of faith", or simply "confession" (as in e.g. Helvetic Confession). Within Evangelical Protestantism, the terms "doctrinal statement" or "doctrinal basis" tend to be preferred. Doctrinal statements may include positions on lectionary and translations of the Bible, particularly in fundamentalist churches of the King James Only movement.

The term creed is sometimes extended to comparable concepts in non-Christian theologies; thus the Islamic concept of ʿaqīdah (literally "bond, tie") is often rendered as "creed".

Jewish creed

Whether Judaism is creedal in character or not is a question that has generated controversies. Rabbi Milton Steinberg wrote that "By its nature Judaism is averse to formal creeds which of necessity limit and restrain thought" and asserted in his book Basic Judaism (1947) that "Judaism has never arrived at a creed." The 1976 Centenary Platform of the Central Conference of American Rabbis, an organization of Reform rabbis, agrees that "Judaism emphasizes action rather than creed as the primary expression of a religious life."

Others, however, characterize the Shema Yisrael as a creedal statement in strict monotheism embodied in a single prayer: "Hear O Israel, the Lord is our God, the Lord is One" (transliterated Shema Yisrael Adonai Eloheinu Adonai Echad).

A notable statement of Jewish principles of faith was drawn up by Maimonides as his 13 Principles of Faith.

Christian creed

The first confession of faith established within Christianity was the Nicene Creed by the Early Church in 325.  It was established to summarize the foundations of the Christian faith and to protect believers from false doctrines. Various Christian denominations from Protestantism and  Evangelical Christianity have published confession of faith as a basis for fellowship among churches of the same denomination. 

Many Christian denominations did not try to be too exhaustive in their confessions of faith and thus allow different opinions on some secondary topics. In addition, some churches are open to revising their confession of faith when necessary. Moreover, Baptist "confessions of faith" have often had a clause such as this from the First London Baptist Confession (Revised edition, 1646):

Excommunication 
Excommunication is a practice of the Bible to exclude members who do not respect the Church's confession of faith and do not want to repent.  It is practiced by all Christian denominations and is intended to protect against the consequences of heretics' teachings and apostasy.

Christians without creeds
Some Christian denominations do not profess a creed. This stance is often referred to as "non-creedalism". 

Anabaptism, with its origins in the 16th century Radical Reformation, spawned a number of sects and denominations that espouse "No creed, but the Bible/New Testament". This was a common reason for Anabaptist persecution from Catholic and Protestant believers. Anabaptist groups that exist today include the Amish, Hutterites, Mennonites, Schwarzenau Brethren (Church of the Brethren), River Brethren, Bruderhof, and the Apostolic Christian Church

The Religious Society of Friends, the group known as the Quakers, was founded in the 17th century and is similarly non-creedal. They believe that such formal structures, “be they written words, steeple-houses or a clerical hierarchy,” cannot take the place of communal relationships and a shared connection with God.

Similar reservations about the use of creeds can be found in the Restoration Movement and its descendants, the Christian Church (Disciples of Christ), the Churches of Christ, and the Christian churches and churches of Christ. Restorationists profess "no creed but Christ".

Jehovah's Witnesses contrast "memorizing or repeating creeds" with acting to "do what Jesus said".

Christian creeds

Several creeds originated in Christianity.
 1 Corinthians 15:3–7 includes an early creed about Jesus' death and resurrection which was probably received by Paul. The antiquity of the creed has been located by most biblical scholars to no more than five years after Jesus' death, probably originating from the Jerusalem apostolic community.
 The Old Roman Creed is an earlier and shorter version of the Apostles' Creed. It was based on the 2nd century Rules of Faith and the interrogatory declaration of faith for those receiving baptism, which by the 4th century was everywhere tripartite in structure, following Matthew 28:19.
 The Apostles' Creed is used in Western Christianity for both liturgical and catechetical purposes.
 The Nicene Creed reflects the concerns of the First Council of Nicaea in 325 which had as their chief purpose to establish what Christians believed.
 The Chalcedonian Creed was adopted at the Council of Chalcedon in 451 in Asia Minor. It defines that Christ is 'acknowledged in two natures', which 'come together into one person and hypostasis'.
 The Athanasian Creed (Quicunque vult) is a Christian statement of belief focusing on Trinitarian doctrine and Christology. It is the first creed in which the equality of the three persons of the Trinity is explicitly stated and differs from the Nicene and Apostles' Creeds in the inclusion of anathemas, or condemnations of those who disagree with the Creed.
 The Tridentine Creed was initially contained in the papal bull Iniunctum Nobis, issued by Pope Pius IV on November 13, 1565.  The creed was intended to summarize the teaching of the Council of Trent (1545–1563).
 The Maasai Creed is a creed composed in  1960 by the Maasai people of East Africa in collaboration with  missionaries  from the Congregation of the Holy Ghost. The creed attempts to express the essentials of the Christian faith within the Maasai culture.
 The Credo of the People of God is a confession of faith that Pope Paul VI published with the motu proprio Solemni hac liturgia of 30 June 1968. Pope Paul VI spoke of it as "a creed which, without being strictly speaking a dogmatic definition, repeats in substance, with some developments called for by the spiritual condition of our time, the creed of Nicea, the creed of the immortal tradition of the holy Church of God."

Christian confessions of faith
Protestant denominations are usually associated with confessions of faith, which are similar to creeds but usually longer.
 The Sixty-seven Articles of the Swiss reformers, drawn up by Zwingli in 1523;
 The Schleitheim Confession of the Anabaptist Swiss Brethren  in 1527; 
 The Augsburg Confession of 1530, the work of Martin Luther and Philip Melanchthon, which marked the breach with Rome;
 The Tetrapolitan Confession of the German Reformed Church, 1530;
 The Smalcald Articles of Martin Luther, 1537
 The Guanabara Confession of Faith, 1558;
 The Gallic Confession, 1559;
 The Scots Confession, drawn up by John Knox in 1560;
 The Belgic Confession drawn up by Guido de Bres in 1561;
 The Thirty-nine Articles of the Church of England in 1562;
 The Formula of Concord and its Epitome in 1577;
 The Irish Articles in 1615;
 The Remonstrant Confession in 1621;
 The Baptist Confession of Faith in 1644 (upheld by Reformed Baptists)
 The Westminster Confession of Faith in 1647 was the work of the Westminster Assembly of Divines and has commended itself to the Presbyterian Churches of all English-speaking peoples, and also in other languages.
 The Savoy Declaration of 1658 which was a modification of the Westminster Confession to suit Congregationalist polity;
The Standard Confession in 1660 (upheld by General Baptists);
The Orthodox Creed in 1678 (upheld by General Baptists);
 The Baptist Confession in 1689 (upheld by Reformed Baptists);
 The Confession of Faith of the Calvinistic Methodists (Presbyterians) of Wales of 1823;
 The Chicago-Lambeth Quadrilateral of the Anglican Communion in 1870;
 The Assemblies of God Statement of Fundamental Truths in 1916; and
 The Confession of Faith of the United Methodist Church, adopted in 1968

The Church of Jesus Christ of Latter-day Saints 

Within the sects of the Latter Day Saint movement, the Articles of Faith are contained in a list which was composed by Joseph Smith as part of an 1842 letter which he sent to "Long" John Wentworth, editor of the Chicago Democrat. It is canonized along with the King James Version of the Bible, the Book of Mormon, the Doctrine & Covenants and the Pearl of Great Price, as a part of the standard works of the Church of Jesus Christ of Latter-day Saints.

Controversies 
In the Swiss Reformed Churches, there was a quarrel about the Apostles' Creed in the mid-19th century. As a result, most cantonal reformed churches stopped prescribing any particular creed.

In 2005, Bishop John Shelby Spong, retired Episcopal Bishop of Newark, has written that dogmas and creeds were merely "a stage in our development" and "part of our religious childhood." In his book, Sins of the Scripture, Spong wrote that "Jesus seemed to understand that no one can finally fit the holy God into his or her creeds or doctrines. That is idolatry."

Islamic creed

In Islamic theology, the term most closely corresponding to "creed" is ʿaqīdah. The first such creed was written as "a short answer to the pressing heresies of the time" is known as Al-Fiqh Al-Akbar and ascribed to Abū Ḥanīfa. Two well known creeds were the Fiqh Akbar II "representative" of the al-Ash'ari, and Fiqh Akbar III, "representative" of the Ash-Shafi'i.

Iman in Islamic theology denotes a believer's religious faith. Its most simple definition is the belief in the six articles of faith, known as arkān al-īmān.
Belief in God
Belief in the Angels
Belief in Divine Books
Belief in the Prophets
Belief in the Day of Judgment
Belief in God's predestination

Religions without creeds

Following a debate that lasted more than twenty years, the National Conference of the American Unitarian Association passed a resolution in 1894 that established the denomination as non-creedal.  The Unitarians later merged with the Universalist Church of America to form the Unitarian Universalist Association (UUA).  Instead of a creed, the UUA abides by a set of principles, such as “a free and responsible search for truth and meaning”.  It cites diverse sources of inspiration, including Christianity, Judaism, Humanism, and Earth-centered traditions.

See also
 Credo
 Mission statement
 The American's Creed – a 1917 statement about Americans' belief in democracy
 The Five Ks
 Pesher

References

Further reading
 Christian Confessions: a Historical Introduction, [by] Ted A. Campbell. First ed. xxi, 336 p. Louisville, Ky.: Westminster/John Knox Press, 1996. 
 Creeds and Confessions of Faith in the Christian Tradition. Edited by Jaroslav Pelikan and Valerie Hotchkiss.  Yale University Press 2003.
 Creeds in the Making: a Short Introduction to the History of Christian Doctrine, [by] Alan Richardson. Reissued. London: S.C.M. Press, 1979, cop. 1935. 128 p. 
 Ecumenical Creeds and Reformed Confessions. Grand Rapids, Mich.: C.R.C. [i.e. Christian Reformed Church] Publications, 1987. 148 p. 
 The Three Forms of Unity (Heidelberg Catechism, Belgic Confession, [and the] Canons of Dordrecht), and the Ecumenical Creeds (the Apostles' Creed, the Athanasian Creed, [and the] Creed of Chalcedon). Reprinted [ed.]. Mission Committee of the Protestant Reformed Churches in America, 1991. 58 p. Without ISBN

External links

 The Creeds of Christendom – A website linking to many formal Christian declarations of faith.
 Creeds and Canons – A Guide to Early Church Documents from Internet Christian Library
 ICP Website International Creed for Peace

Christian genres
Religious terminology